Lynn Huggins-Cooper (born ) is an English author. She has written more than 200 books and is best known for her book Downshift to the Good Life (a guide to simplified living), and also for her many children's books. Most recently she has published her newest children's novel "Walking with Witches" for Tyne Bridge Publishing, which was illustrated by Nigel J Brewis.

Concepts 
Downshift to the Good Life promotes self sufficiency, de-cluttering, simplification, and green living (including recycling and organic gardening). The book has been featured in the press, and has been recommended by many organisations.

Life 
Huggins-Cooper lived for many years on a farm in County Durham. With her children Alex, Bethany and Eleanor she raised horses, goats, chickens, cats, dogs, rabbits and guinea pigs. She married her writer husband Tom in 2011 and now lives next to 900 acres of woodland.

References

External links 
 
 Lynn Huggins-Cooper on Myspace
 Walking With Witches

21st-century English novelists
People from Brighton
1964 births
Living people
English children's writers